St David's Welsh Church, Colwyn Bay (Eglwys Dewi Sant) is in Rhiw Road, Colwyn Bay, Conwy County Borough, Wales.  It is an Anglican church in the parish of Colwyn Bay with Bryn-Y-Maen, the deanery of Rhos, the archdeaconry of St Asaph, and the diocese of St Asaph.  The church is situated behind St Paul's Church and is a Grade II listed building.

St David's Church was built in 1902–03 and designed by the Chester firm of architects Douglas and Minshull.  It is a small church with an apsidal sanctuary.  The west window is Perpendicular in style.  Rising from the roof is a square bellcote with a pyramidal roof on which is an octagonal spirelet.  Internally, the screen was made by a local blacksmith, David Jones.

As its name suggests, the services held in the church are in Welsh.

See also
List of new churches by John Douglas

References

Churches completed in 1903
20th-century Church in Wales church buildings
Gothic Revival church buildings in Wales
Church in Wales church buildings
Grade II listed churches in Conwy County Borough
John Douglas buildings
Colwyn Bay